NYX Professional Makeup is an American cosmetics company that is a subsidiary of L'Oréal. The company was founded in Los Angeles by Toni Ko in 1999. It was named after Nyx, the Greek goddess of the night. NYX Professional Makeup is "certified" and acknowledged by PETA as a cruelty-free brand, and they offer a wide range of vegan-friendly products. NYX products are sold in over 70 countries at thousands of retailers, ranging from specialty beauty and fashion stores to freestanding shops and the brand's corporate website.

History
Toni Ko founded NYX Cosmetics when she was 25 using a $250,000 loan from her parents. Ko knew a guy from New Jersey who made pencils, from there, she started with six eyeliners and 12 lip liners, priced at $1.99 and was sold out in less than 30 days. The company's first products were jumbo eye pencils, which brought in revenue of $2 million within the first year. The products were initially sold only to beauty professionals before Ko expanded sale to mass-market outlets. The products were marketed as having "department store beauty" while being sold at "drugstore prices."

In 2011, NYX launched the Freedom and Artistry for Creative Expression (FACE) awards competition.

Sales in 2014 were $120 million. Ulta Beauty carries mass market NYX products.

L'Oréal acquisition
In 2014, Ko sold NYX to the international beauty company L'Oréal for $500 million. The sale had a five-year non-compete clause.

NYX Cosmetics continues under other management as a part of L'Oréal, and now provides products including lipstick, lip gloss, and mineral foundation. In September 2015, L'Oréal introduced brick-and-mortar stores devoted to NYX cosmetics. NYX currently operates standalone stores in Australia, Austria, Armenia, Belgium, Canada, Chile, Croatia, Estonia, France, Germany, India, Latvia, Lithuania, Romania, Serbia, Spain, the UK, and the USA. In 2016, NYX reported annual sales growth of 4.7 percent and launched NYX Professional Makeup.

Masterclass Program
In September 2018, NYX launched Masterclass, an exclusive online educational content library featuring a group of professional makeup artists and top beauty vloggers. The program aims to provide consumers of all skill sets with accessible, professional-grade makeup education.

Partnerships
On March 6, 2019, NYX announced their first exclusive cosmetics sponsorship of the 2019 Coachella Valley Music and Arts Festival. The partnership will provide guests access to innovative digital beauty experiences on the festival grounds, ranging from an interactive beauty bar and touch up area fully equipped with glitter makeup and a glitter fountain, to a massive lip and tongue slide.

On June 23, 2021, Dignitas Verizon 5G gaming center announced NYX professional Makeup Partnership, NYX branding appeared on the competitive jerseys of its Dignitas women's VALORANT and CS: GO teams, as well as on the jerseys of select Dignitas content creators.

References

External links

 
 is NYX cruelty-free
 is NYX cruelty-free

1999 establishments in California
Cosmetics companies of the United States
American companies established in 1999
Chemical companies established in 1999
L'Oréal brands
2014 mergers and acquisitions
Nyx
Companies based in Los Angeles